Paul C. Evans (born January 31, 1945) is a former American head coach of men's college basketball.

Paul Evans was noted for running a "power offense" with emphasis on distributing the ball through centers and power forwards. His tenures at Navy and Pittsburgh was notable for the development of quality big men such as David Robinson, Charles Smith, Jerome Lane, Brian Shorter, Bobby Martin, Darren Morningstar, and Eric Mobley. He coached at Division III St. Lawrence University for seven season guiding them to six ICAC Conference Championships and five NCAA Division III post-season appearances, including two regional finals. He went on to coach at Navy for six seasons and an overall 199–60 (.665) record which included a cinderella appearance in the 1986 Elite Eight led by star center Robinson. After taking over at Pitt starting in the 1986–87 season, he guided the Panthers to regular season Big East Conference titles in 1987 and 1988, several top 10 rankings in the polls (including as high as #2), and saw the team advance to five NCAA tournaments and one NIT.  John Calipari was an assistant under Evans at Pitt prior to him obtaining the head coaching position at UMass. Evans' win–loss record at the University of Pittsburgh was 147–98 (.600) over eight seasons. He was succeeded as head coach at Pitt by Ralph Willard.

Head coaching record

References

Additional sources

Navy Basketball Media Guide

1945 births
Living people
American men's basketball coaches
Ithaca Bombers football players
Ithaca Bombers men's basketball players
Navy Midshipmen men's basketball coaches
Pittsburgh Panthers men's basketball coaches
St. Lawrence Saints men's basketball coaches
American men's basketball players